Slobodskoy (masculine), Slobodskaya (feminine), or Slobodskoye (neuter) may refer to:
Slobodskoy District, a district of Kirov Oblast, Russia
Slobodskoy (inhabited locality) (Slobodskaya, Slobodskoye), name of several inhabited localities in Russia